Samuel Pizzetti (born 16 October 1986) is an Italian freestyle swimmer from Codogno.  He swam at two Olympics; the 1500 m in 2008 and the 400 m in 2012.

References 
 

1986 births
Living people
People from Codogno
Italian male swimmers
Swimmers at the 2008 Summer Olympics
Swimmers at the 2012 Summer Olympics
Italian male freestyle swimmers
Olympic swimmers of Italy
European Aquatics Championships medalists in swimming
Mediterranean Games silver medalists for Italy
Mediterranean Games bronze medalists for Italy
Swimmers at the 2005 Mediterranean Games
Swimmers at the 2009 Mediterranean Games
Mediterranean Games medalists in swimming
Swimmers of Centro Sportivo Carabinieri
Sportspeople from the Province of Lodi
21st-century Italian people